Antaeotricha thysanodes is a moth of the family Depressariidae. It is found in Guyana, French Guiana and Brazil.

The wingspan is 28–31 mm. The forewings are purplish-brown, darker towards the base and along the costa, the posterior two-fifths suffused with light brownish-ochreous except towards the costa. The second discal stigma is small and dark fuscous. The hindwings are dark grey with the costal margin expanded to beyond the middle, on the undersurface with a subcostal fringe of long projecting grey-whitish hairs from above vein 8 towards its apex.

References

Moths described in 1915
thysanodes
Moths of South America